The Dongguan–Foshan Expressway, designated as G9411 and commonly referred to as the Guanfo Expressway is an expressway that connects Dongguan, Guangdong, China and Foshan, Guangdong. It is a spur of G94 Pearl River Delta Ring Expressway and is entirely in Guangdong Province.

It terminates at the G94 Pearl River Delta Ring Expressway on both ends, serving as an east-west connector inside the ring of the main expressway.

References

Chinese national-level expressways
Expressways in Guangdong
Transport in Dongguan
Foshan